Todd Snyder  is an American fashion designer based in New York City. He founded his eponymous fashion label in 2011. The brand was acquired by American Eagle Outfitters in 2015.

Early life and education 
Snyder was born and raised in Ames, Iowa, where he played on his high school's football team. He initially studied finance at Iowa State University before changing his major to apparel merchandising and design.

Career
Snyder founded his namesake label in 2011 in New York City. Snyder moved to New York to design outerwear for Polo Ralph Lauren before becoming the director of menswear for the Gap Inc. Afterwards, Snyder became SVP of menswear at J. Crew, where he introduced formal wear and created collaborations with heritage brands, including Timex, Red Wing Shoes, Thomas Mason, and Alden.
   
Todd Snyder the brand launched its first menswear collection in the Fall of 2011, at retailers Bergdorf Goodman, Ron Herman, and Neiman Marcus. Snyder is inspired by Savile Row craftsmanship, military tailoring, and New York style. In 2012, the fashion label was picked up by Barneys New York and select Nordstrom stores.

American Eagle purchased the Todd Snyder clothing brand, and Snyder's Tailgate brand of vintage-inspired collegiate sportswear, for $ 11 million in November 2015.

Collaborations
In 2013 Todd Snyder launched a partnership with Champion of Winston-Salem, North Carolina (established in 1919), to create an ongoing collaboration.

In July 2019, Snyder launched the Moby’s x Todd Snyder collection, a collaboration with Hamptons restaurateur Lincoln Pilcher.

Awards and honors
2012 CFDA/Swarovski Award for Menswear
2012 GQ’s Best New Menswear Designers
2013 CFDA/Vogue Fashion Fund finalist

References

External links

Bruce Willis in Todd Snyder

Living people
2011 establishments in New York City
Clothing brands of the United States
Clothing companies based in New York City
People from Ames, Iowa
American fashion designers
American fashion businesspeople
Menswear designers
Year of birth missing (living people)
Iowa State University alumni